Marc Armand Rousso is a French businessman, and the founder of Accoona.com, a business-to-business search engine, and X3D Technology. He is the father of Vanessa Rousso, professional poker player and Big Brother contestant.

Biography 
Rousso settled in the United States in 1982, working as a trader of stamps. In 1985 he stated he bartered $45 million (catalog value) in rare postage stamps.

In 1986, when the Internet was a little known entity, Rousso started an online stamp exchange website, The International Stamp Exchange, which lasted until 1990. The International Stamp Exchange was part of a network run by David N. Glassman who created NaicoNet, the first online retail online stock trading system.  Rousso thought online advertising revenues could be lucrative enough to make a business dedicated to philatelists profitable. Rousso and the ISE are profiled in the March 28, 1988 issue of New York Magazine.

Rousso was identified as having bought, at a 2010 auction, the Treskilling Yellow, a unique Swedish postage stamp printed in the wrong color. The stamp had been auctioned on 22 May 2010, by David Feldman in Geneva, Switzerland, for at least $2.3 million, the world's record price for a stamp at auction.  In May 2013 the stamp was acquired in a private sale by Count Gustaf Douglas, a Swedish nobleman and politician.

In January 1999 Rousso was arrested for securities fraud for defrauding millions of dollars from investors - and money laundering.  Rousso ultimately came to plea agreements with the federal government after spending approximately one year in jail.

Accoona search engine
Rousso was founder of Accoona, a B2B search engine. Launched in 2004 with former President Bill Clinton as chief spokesman for its launch, the company failed to gain any significant part of the search engine market, though the online electronics retailers it also owns did make the company money. Clinton reportedly made $700,000 for his Clinton Foundation in 2006 from selling Accoona stock. The initial $80.5 million offering was underwritten by Maxim Group. However, as The New York Times reported, "Accoona.com attracted only 106,000 visitors from the United States in July (2007), according to comScore, which monitors Internet traffic." The underwriter withdrew, possibly as a result of Rousso's checkered past. In 2008, the company was acquired by Masterseek.

Chess
Rousso is active in international chess and with his company X3D Technologies, which develops 3-D technology for the internet, sponsored several World Championship Matches, including Garry Kasparov vs Anatoly Karpov (2002) and Garry Kasparov vs X3D Fritz (2003).

References

French businesspeople
Living people
Year of birth missing (living people)
Stamp dealers
French emigrants to the United States
Chess patrons